Rashoderick "Shock" Linwood (born October 13, 1993) is an American former college football running back. He played for the Baylor Bears football team at Baylor University.

Early years
Linwood attended Linden-Kildare High School in Linden, Texas, where he was an All-state running back, but also played quarterback, linebacker, defensive back and returned kicks. As junior in 2010, he led Kildare to 10-3 record and regional semifinals, ran for 1,473 yards and 18 touchdowns (156 attempts) and made 14 receptions for 138 yards and two more scores. He was named 2010 All-District 8-2A. He was named the 2011 first-team Class 2A All-State running back and was an honorable mention All-state quarterback as senior after rushing for 2,105 yards and 25 touchdowns (241 attempts), ranking fifth in the state in rushing yardage, and also threw for 729 yards and five touchdowns. He was also selected the 2011 District 8-2A Player of Year and was named to the 2011 East Texas All-Area first team as running back. Also a letterman in track & field, Linwood competed as a sprinter and had a personal-best of 10.98 seconds in the 100-meter dash.

He was ranked by 247Sports.com as the 33rd best athlete recruit and No. 74 overall prospect in Texas. He was listed as nation's No. 80 safety prospect by Scout.com. He was also ranked No. 89 by Rivals.com's Lone Star Recruiting and No. 101 by SuperPrep's Texas 121.

College career

Redshirt Freshman
Linwood did not play in any games as a true freshman in 2012. As a redshirt freshman in 2013 he appeared in twelve of thirteen games as a backup to Lache Seastrunk. He started in two games in place of injured Seastrunk and Glasco Martin. Linwood rushed for a freshman school record 881 yards, breaking Robert Griffin III's mark of 843 in 2008. Linwood's 881 yards and 8 touchdowns earned him Freshman All-American honors.

Sophomore

As a sophomore in 2014, Linwood rushed for 1,252 yards and 16 touchdowns as the first string running back. He also led Baylor to their second consecutive Big 12 title.

Junior

Linwood was considered a possible contender for the Heisman Trophy during the 2015 season.

Senior
In 2016, Linwood played during the regular season (with the exception of the November 12 game against Oklahoma) with the Bears recording a season record of 6:6. He sat out the post-season Cactus Bowl to focus on possible NFL career.

College Statistics

Statistics for Linwood's college football appearances:

References

1993 births
Living people
Baylor Bears football players
People from Linden, Texas
Players of American football from Texas
American football running backs
African-American players of American football
21st-century African-American sportspeople